The 2016 Kentucky Wildcats football team (variously "Kentucky", "UK", or "Wildcats") represented the University of Kentucky in the 2016 NCAA Division I FBS football season. The season was the program's 123rd overall and 83rd as a member of the Southeastern Conference (SEC). They were led by fourth-year head coach Mark Stoops and the played home games at Commonwealth Stadium in Lexington, Kentucky. They finished the season 7–6, 4–4 in SEC play to finish in a three-way tie for second place in the Eastern Division. They were invited to the TaxSlayer Bowl where they lost to Georgia Tech.

Pre-season

Previous season
In 2015, the Wildcats lost six out of their last seven games after starting the season 4–1, completing their second year under Mark Stoops at 5–7 and 2–6 in the SEC (6th-East). They lost to in-state rival Louisville, 38–24, to end the season, missing out on their fifth consecutive bowl game since the 2010 season.

Departures

2016 signing class

Prior to National Signing Day on February 3, 2016, five players enrolled for the spring semester in order to participate in spring practice and included four former high school seniors and one junior college transfer.

On National Signing Day, Kentucky signed an additional twenty players out of high school and junior college that completed the 2016 recruiting class. The class was highlighted by three Army All-American's as well as Kentucky's Mr. Football.

Personnel

Coaching staff
Kentucky head coach Mark Stoops enters his fourth season as the Wildcat's head coach for the 2016 season.  During his previous three seasons he led the Wildcats to an overall record of 12 wins and 24 losses.

On December 18, 2015, Offensive Coordinator Shannon Dawson announced he would not return to the program for the 2016 season as the offensive coordinator.  In his place Kentucky hired Cincinnati offensive coordinator Eddie Gran as the assistant head coach of offense at Kentucky. Cincinnati quarterbacks coach Darin Hinshaw has also joined the UK staff as quarterbacks coach and co-offensive coordinator.

2016 signing class

Returning starters

Offense

Defense

Special teams

Roster

Schedule
Kentucky announced its 2016 football schedule on October 29, 2015. The 2016 schedule consists of 7 home and 5 away games in the regular season. The Wildcats will host SEC foes Georgia, Mississippi State, South Carolina, and Vanderbilt, and will travel to Alabama, Florida, Missouri, and Tennessee.

The team will host three out of four of its non–conference games which are against Austin Peay from the Ohio Valley Conference, New Mexico State Aggies from the Sun Belt Conference, Louisville from the Atlantic Coast Conference, and Southern Miss Golden Eagles from Conference USA.

Schedule Source:

Game summaries

Southern Mississippi

Florida

New Mexico State

South Carolina

Alabama

Vanderbilt

Mississippi State

Missouri

Georgia

Tennessee

Austin Peay

Louisville

Georgia Tech

References

Kentucky
Kentucky Wildcats football seasons
Kentucky Wildcats football